Freedom is Michael W. Smith's fifteenth album. It was released in 2000 on Reunion Records, and is his first full-length album consisting of only instrumentals. A promotional live EP, The Acoustic Set - A Live Recording, was available as a pre-order bonus.

Track listing

Personnel 
 Michael W. Smith – acoustic piano, Hammond B3 organ, keyboards, programming 
 Bryan Lenox – keyboards, programming, drums, percussion 
 Chris Graffignino – guitars
 Matt Pierson – bass guitar
 Craig Young – bass guitar
 Chris Estes – drums, percussion
 Eric Darken – drums, percussion 
 Dan Needham – drums, percussion
 Scott Williamson – drums, percussion 
 David Downs (Dublin) – Illyan pipes
 Hunter Lee – Illyan pipes
 Marie Breathnach (Dublin) – Irish fiddle
 John Catchings – cello
 Max Dyer – cello 
 David Davidson – violin solo, string arrangements (5)
 Tim Theiss – nail gun (probably used as additional percussion)
 Joel White – nail gun
 Rod Schuler – DJ
 The Irish Film Orchestra – strings
 Catriona Walsh – music supervisor 
 The Nashville String Machine – strings
 Carl Gorodetzsky – contractor
 David Hamilton – string arrangements and orchestra conductor
 Larry Paxton – string arrangements (5)
 Kristin Wilkinson – string arrangements (5)
 Ric Domenico – music preparation
 Eberhard Ramm – music preparation

Production 
 Michael W. Smith – executive producer, producer 
 Bryan Lenox – producer, engineer, mixing, string recording 
 Ronnie Brookshire – string recording 
 Bill Sommerville-Large – string recording (Dublin)
 David Bryant – assistant engineer
 Rob Burrell – assistant engineer
 Eric Elwell – assistant engineer, technical coordinator, production coordinator 
 Terry Flowers – assistant engineer, production assistant 
 Ron Jagger – assistant engineer 
 Scott Lenox – assistant engineer 
 Kieran Lynch – assistant engineer (Dublin)
 Fred Paragano – Pro Tools engineer
 Hank Williams – sequencing, editing, mastering  
 Toby Gaines – production assistant 
 Ryan Smith – production assistant 
 Erin Williams – production assistant 
 Chad Dickerson – production coordination
 Tim Parker – art direction, design 
 Andrew Southam – photography (New York) 
 Jimmy Abegg – photography (Ireland)
 Joe Oppedisano – wardrobe
 Julie Matos – hair, make-up
 James Masenburg – prop stylist 

Studios
 Recorded at Deer Valley Studio (Franklin, TN), East Iris Sound (Nashville, TN) and Windmill Lane Studios (Dublin, Ireland).
 Strings recorded at Windmill Lane Studios, Ocean Way Nashville (Nashville, TN) and Javelina Studio (Nashville, TN).
 Mixed at Deer Valley Studio
 Sequenced, Edited and Mastered at MasterMix (Nashville, TN).

Chart performance

References

Michael W. Smith albums
2000 albums
American patriotic songs
Instrumental albums
Reunion Records albums